Prague British International School (PBIS), previously Prague British School (PBS), is a British international school in Prague, Czech Republic. It is an independent English language, multinational day school, providing British education for children aged between 20 months and 19 years. It has three campuses: the Kamýk and Libuš campuses in Prague 4, and the Vlastina campus in Liboc, Prague 6.

In 1996, the school introduced the IGCSE programme. The school, established as the British International School Prague (BISP) in 1992, changed its name to Prague British School in 2006. BISP had 500 registered students at the time.

In 2017 it was announced that the school had been purchased by Nord Anglia Education, and from September 2018, the school would be merged with The English International School Prague as the PBIS.

Curriculum
PBIS pupils up to Year 9 follow the National Curriculum for England. Pupils in Years 10 and 11 follow the International General Certificate of Secondary Education (IGCSE), followed by the International Baccalaureate (IB) diploma in years 12 and 13.

Sites

The Prague British International School has three main sites:
Kamýk in Prague 4 serves ages 2–14. It is a large site located in the south east of Prague. Since 2004, it had been the main pre-merger PBS school site, housing a Foundation Stage Unit, Primary and Senior School and the school administration. Approximately 550 students attend the Kamýk site. Since 2004, it has undergone extensive reconstruction, including the building of new outdoor sports facilities, a theatre and a new dining room and kitchen, a new Senior School library and multimedia center.
Libuš campus in Prague 4, serving ages 14–18 and having International Baccalaureate and IGCSE courses. It has a  building on a  plot of land. It belonged to the pre-merger The English International School Prague and opened in 2007.
Vlastina in Liboc, Prague 6, serves ages 3–14. It opened in 2008 and as a pre-merger PBS campus it had Foundation Stage Unit and Primary School only. Graduates then transferred to the senior school at Kamýk to continue. It had approximately 250 students.

The Council of British International Schools (COBIS) describes PBIS as "an established school of quality and distinction" adding "All teaching staff are highly qualified and experienced graduate teachers, with relevant experience of the National Curriculum, IGCSE and IB programmes."

References

External links

Educational institutions established in 1992
Schools in Prague
British international schools in Europe
International schools in the Czech Republic
Nord Anglia Education
1992 establishments in Czechoslovakia